Uruguay competed in the Winter Olympic Games for the first (and, so far, only) time at the 1998 Winter Olympics in Nagano, Japan.

Alpine skiing

Men

References
 Official Olympic Reports
 Comité Olímpico Uruguayo
 Olympic Winter Games 1998, full results by sports-reference.com

Nations at the 1998 Winter Olympics
1998
Winter Olympics